Towase Abayomi Alvin (born June 20, 1993) is a popular multi-award-winning Nigerian actor and model. Beginning his career in Nollywood, Alvin starred in numerous Nollywood television shows and films. He is the recipient of several awards such as the 19 Rom Awards Best Actor award in 2017.

Career 
In 2013, he made his entry professionally into acting by joining Nollywood. He had a series of auditions and eventually got his first role in a movie, ‘Collateral War’ in 2014 directed by Iwuanyanwu Chuks and produced by Chioma Okeke. The movie also had top Nollywood actors like Yvonne Jegede and John Dumelo.

His next movie was 'Calabash Banking Series’ by Obi Emelonye, where he played a secondary role.

He has since starred in several Nollywood movies and televisions series including such as Jenifa's Diary, Isoken, MTV Shuga Naija, Jemeji, Moms at War, The Johnsons, Alive, Mentally, Truth, A Naija Christmas, You and Me and The Guys.

In 2022, he was announced a secondary cast in Benneth Nwankwo directed dance-drama TV series, Breakout. The series is dubbed the first dance-drama TV series in Nigeria.

Awards and recognitions 

Abayomi received several awards and was nominated for others. That includes the 2017 Best Actor award from 19teen Rom Awards and the Industry Cynosure from Maya Awards.

He was nominated for Revelation of the Year 2017 at the Best of Nollywood Awards, Most Promising Actor (English) at the City People Entertainment Awards, Most Promising Actor at the African Entertainment Legends Awards, Next Rated Actor 2018 at the Nigerian Achievers Awards, Revelation of the year at the Tush all Youth Awards, and Most Promising Actor 2018 at the Scream All Youth Awards.

In 2022, he was nominated in The Future Awards Africa Prize For Acting alongside Teniola Aladese, Maryam Yahhaya, Nengi Adoki, Temi Ami-Williams, Emeka Nwagbaraocha, and Bimbo Ademoye

See also
 List of Nigerian actors

References 

Living people
1993 births
Nigerian male film actors
Nigerian male models
Nigerian television personalities